Lights is the debut studio album by the English alternative rock band Brigade. It was produced by Joe Gibb and released on 29 May 2006 through independent label Mighty Atom Records.

Track listing

Limited Edition
A limited edition version of the album was released featuring two extra tracks and a bonus DVD.

Bonus Tracks
12. "Safe Hands"
13. "21"

DVD

Promo Videos
Magneto
 Meet Me At My Funeral
 Go Slow
 Meet Me At My Funeral (2004)
Live Videos from "The Bull and Gate" in 2003
From the Floor (fan videos)
Early demos and alternative mixes
Photo Gallery

Personnel
The following personnel contributed to Lights:
 Will Simpson - lead vocals, rhythm guitar, lyrics
 James Plant - lead guitar, backing vocals
 Naoto Hori - bass guitar
 Nathaniel Finbow - drums, percussion

References

2006 debut albums
Brigade (band) albums